Melanargia is a genus of butterflies belonging to the family Nymphalidae and the subfamily Satyrinae (formerly family Satyridae).

This genus, described by Johann Wilhelm Meigen in 1828, is the only genus in the subtribe Melanargiina, Wheeler, 1903.

The adults of this genus of satyrines are easily distinguished by their white wings with black veins and markings (hence the common name "marbled whites"). A peculiar phenotypic distinctiveness is also a dilated vein 12 at the base of the forewing.

Butterflies of genus Melanargia are widespread from Europe and north Africa to Japan.

Species and subspecies
The investigations on genetic divergence and phylogenetic relationships among Melanargia species have recognized three subgenera (Melanargia, Argeformia, and Halimede) and reclassified the genus in 20 species and relevant subspecies as follows

Subgenus Melanargia Meigen, 1829
 Melanargia galathea (Linnaeus, 1758) - marbled white
 Melanargia galathea ssp. galathea (Linnaeus, 1758) (Europe)
 Melanargia galathea ssp. satnia Fruhstorfer, 1917 (Caucasus)
 Melanargia galathea ssp. magdalenae Reichl, 1975
 Melanargia galathea ssp. syracusana Zeller, 1847
 Melanargia lucasi (Rambur, 1858) (northern Africa)
 Melanargia lucasi ssp. lucasi (Rambur, 1858)
 Melanargia lucasi ssp. meadwaldoi Rothschild, 1917
 Melanargia lachesis (Hübner, 1790) - Iberian marbled white
 Melanargia evartianae Wagener, 1976 (northern Iran)
 Melanargia evartianae ssp. evartianae Wagener, 1976
 Melanargia evartianae ssp. sadjadii Carbonell & Naderi, 2006
 Melanargia teneates (Ménétriés, 1832) (northern Iran)
 Melanargia teneates ssp. teneates (Ménétriés, 1832)
 Melanargia teneates ssp. meda (Grum-Grshimailo, 1895)
 Melanargia larissa (Geyer, 1828) - Balkan marbled white
 Melanargia larissa ssp. larissa (Geyer, 1828)
 Melanargia larissa ssp. hylata (Ménétriés, 1832) (Turkey and Iran)
 Melanargia larissa ssp. grumi Standfuss, 1892
 Melanargia larissa ssp. lorestanensis Carbonell & Naderi, 2007
 Melanargia larissa ssp. iranica Seitz, 1907
 Melanargia larissa ssp. taurica (Rober, 1896)
 Melanargia larissa ssp. massageta Staudinger, 1901
 Melanargia larissa ssp. karabagi Koçak, 1976
 Melanargia larissa ssp. kocaki Wagener, 1983
 Melanargia larissa ssp. syriaca (Oberthür, 1894)
 Melanargia larissa ssp. titea (Klug, 1832) (= titania Calberla, 1891, = standfussi Wagener, 1983)
 Melanargia wiskotii Rober, 1896
 Melanargia russiae (Esper, 1783) - Esper's marbled white (southern Europe to central Asia)
 Melanargia russiae ssp. russiae (Esper, 1793)
 Melanargia russiae ssp. cleanthe (Boisduval, 1833)
 Melanargia russiae ssp. japygia (Cyrillo, 1787)
 Melanargia transcaspica (Staudinger, 1901)
 Melanargia transcaspica ssp. transcaspica (Staudinger, 1901)
 Melanargia transcaspica ssp. eberti Wagener, 1975
 Melanargia parce Staudinger, 1882
 Melanargia lucida (Staudinger, 1886)

Subgenus Argeformia Verity, 1953
 Melanargia occitanica (Esper, 1793) - western marbled white (south-west of Europe, northern Africa and Sicily)
 Melanargia occitanica ssp. occitanica (Esper, 1793)
 Melanargia occitanica ssp. pelagia (Oberthur, 1911)
 Melanargia occitanica ssp. pherusa (Boisduval, 1832)
 Melanargia ines (Hoffmannsegg, 1804) - Spanish marbled white (Portugal, Spain,  Morocco,  Algeria, Tunisia and Libya)
 Melanargia ines ssp. ines (Hoffmannsegg, 1804)
 Melanargia ines ssp. fathme Wagner, 1913
 Melanargia ines ssp. jahandiezi Oberthür, 1922
 Melanargia arge (Sulzer, 1776) - Italian marbled white (Italy)

Subgenus Halimede (Oberthür & Houlbert, 1922)
 Melanargia leda Leech, 1891 (Tibet and western China)
 Melanargia leda ssp. leda (Leech, 1891) (=yunnana Oberthür, 1891)
 Melanargia leda ssp. melli Wagener, 1961
 Melanargia halimede (Ménétriés, 1858) (eastern Mongolia, north-east of China and Korea)
 Melanargia halimede ssp. halimede (Ménétriés, 1858) (=gratiani Wagener, 1961)
 Melanargia halimede ssp. coreana Okamoto, 1926
 Melanargia meridionalis Felder, 1862 (central and western China)
 Melanargia meridionalis ssp. meridionalis (C. & R. Felder, 1862)
 Melanargia meridionalis ssp. tapaishanensis Wagener, 1961
 Melanargia lugens Honrath, 1888 (central China)
 Melanargia lugens ssp. lugens (Honrath, 1888) (= ahyoui Wagener, 1961)
 Melanargia lugens ssp. hengshanensis Wagener, 1961 (= hoenei Wagener, 1961)
 Melanargia lugens ssp. montana (Leech, 1890)
 Melanargia epimede Staudinger, 1892 (eastern Mongolia, north-east of China and Korea)
 Melanargia epimede ssp. epimede (Staudinger, 1887)
 Melanargia epimede ssp. pseudolugens (Staudinger, 1887)
 Melanargia epimede ssp. ganymedes Heyne, 1895 (Tibet)
 Melanargia asiatica (Oberthür & Houlbert, 1922) (= dejeani Wagener, 1961, = elisa Wagener, 1961, = sigberti Bozano, 2004) (China)

Gallery

References
"Melanargia Meigen, 1828" at Markku Savela's Lepidoptera and Some Other Life Forms
BioLib.cz
Satyrini Classification
 Nazari, V., Ten Hagen, W.,Bozano, G.C. 2010. Molecular systematics and phylogeny of the 'Marbled Whites' (Lepidoptera: Nymphalidae, Satyrinae, Melanargia Meigen). Systematic Entomology 35: 132-147

External links

Satyrinae of the Western Palearctic

 
Satyrini
Nymphalidae genera
Taxa named by Johann Wilhelm Meigen